Cajamarca–Cañaris Quechua (locally called Kichwa or Runashimi, like other Quechua varieties) is a branch of Quechua spoken in northern Peru, consisting primarily of Cajamarca Quechua (Kashamarka, also known as Linwa), and Lambayeque Quechua (also known as Ferreñafe, Inkawasi-Kañaris Quechua), near the towns of Cajamarca and Cañaris in the Cajamarca and Lambayeque regions. Cajamarca and Lambayeque Quechua have 94% lexical similarity and are mutually intelligible. Adelaar (2004) includes the dialect of Lincha District, far to the south on the border of the Lima and Huancavelica regions.

Cajamarca–Cañaris Quechua is divergent from other varieties; although traditionally classified as a member of Quechua II-A, some (Adelaar) believe it to be a primary branch of Quechua II, and others (Landerman, Taylor, Heggarty) believe it is a primary branch of Quechua, or include it in Quechua I. Félix Quesada published the first grammar and dictionary in 1976.

According to the UNESCO World Atlas of Languages in Danger, Cajamarca Quechua is severely endangered.

References

Bibliography
Félix Quesada C. (1976): Diccionario Quechua de Cajamarca-Cañaris [– Castellano y vice versa]. Ministerio de educación del Perú
David Coombs et al. (2003): Rimashun kichwapi: Hablemos en quechua
Marco A. Arana Zegarra (2002): Resolución de Conflictos Medioambientales en la Microcuenca del Río Porcón, Cajamarca 1993-2002. Thesis 2002, Pontífica Universidad Católica del Perú.
Ronel Groenewald et al. (2002): Shumaq liyinawan yaĉakushun – Aprendamos con los cuentos bonitos

External links
Pulla purishun: Academia Regional del Idioma kichwa variedad Cajamarca, ARIQC (German web server)
Mushuq Tistamintu: The New Testament in Cajamarca Quechua (PDF)
Mishki Rimay (Dulce Idioma): Dolores Ayay Chilón on Quechua and indigenous culture in the community of Porcón (in Quechua, Spanish subtitles)

Languages of Peru
Quechuan languages